The 2002 NCAA Division I baseball season, play of college baseball in the United States organized by the National Collegiate Athletic Association (NCAA) at the Division I level, began in January 2002.  The season progressed through the regular season, many conference tournaments and championship series, and concluded with the 2002 NCAA Division I baseball tournament and 2002 College World Series.  The College World Series, which consisted of the eight remaining teams in the NCAA tournament, was held in its annual location of Omaha, Nebraska, at Rosenblatt Stadium.  It concluded on June 22, 2002, with the final game of the double-elimination bracket.  Texas defeated South Carolina 12–6 to win its fifth championship.

Format changes
The Northeast Conference dissolved its divisions after 3 seasons.

Conference standings

College World Series

The 2002 season marked the fifty sixth NCAA Baseball Tournament, which culminated with the eight team College World Series.  The College World Series was held in Omaha, Nebraska.  The eight teams played a double-elimination format, with Texas claiming their fifth championship with a 12–6 win over South Carolina in the final.

Bracket

Award winners

All-America team

References

2002 Division I Standings at BoydsWorld.com